Saint-Gence is a commune in the Haute-Vienne department in the Nouvelle-Aquitaine region in west-central France.

Demographics

Inhabitants are known as Saint-Gençois in French.

Entertainment
There is an annual food and wine festival in Saint-Gence, La Vinigast.

See also
Communes of the Haute-Vienne department

References

External links

Official website (in French)

Communes of Haute-Vienne
Lemovices